Pressac is a commune in the Vienne department in the Nouvelle-Aquitaine region in western France.

Geography
The Clouère forms the commune's north-eastern border.

The Clain flows northward through the middle of the commune and crosses the village.

See also
Communes of the Vienne department

References

Communes of Vienne